Siedlce is a Polish parliamentary constituency in the Masovian Voivodeship.  It elects twelve members of the Sejm.

The district has the number '18' for elections to the Sejm and is named after the city of Siedlce.  It includes the counties of Garwolin, Łosice, Maków, Mińsk, Ostrołęka, Ostrów Mazowiecka, Pułtusk, Siedlce, Sokołów, Węgrów, and Wyszków, and the city counties of Ostrołęka and Siedlce.

List of members

2019-2023

Footnotes

Electoral districts of Poland
Masovian Voivodeship
Siedlce